Peter Adalbert Wolff (November 15, 1923 – September 5, 2013) was an American physicist who is considered a pioneer in semiconductor research. He earned his PhD in physics at UC Berkeley with Robert Serber as thesis advisor in 1951 and began his career at the Bell Telephone Laboratories the following year. Thereafter Wolff joined the physics department of Massachusetts Institute of Technology (MIT) in 1970, becoming head of the condensed matter and atomic physics division. Together with P. M. Platzman, he coauthored the textbook Waves and Interactions in Solid State Plasmas (1973). In 1976 he moved on to the directorship of the Research Laboratory of Electronics and then of the Francis Bitter National Magnet Laboratory in 1981. Wolff left the director's chair in 1987 and retired from his faculty position in 1989 to become a fellow of the newly created NEC Research Institute at Princeton University. In 1994 he returned to MIT as the leader of the physics/industry forum for the physics department and remained a professor emeritus there until his death.

References

1923 births
2013 deaths
20th-century American physicists
21st-century American physicists
Massachusetts Institute of Technology School of Science faculty
Scientists at Bell Labs
UC Berkeley College of Engineering alumni
Fellows of the American Physical Society
Princeton University fellows